Natalia Pakulska (born 27 November 1991) is a Polish football midfielder, currently playing for Medyk Konin in Poland's Ekstraliga.

She is a member of the Polish national team.

Personal life
Pakulska was born in Brześć Kujawski. She studies physical education in the Państwowa Wyższa Szkoła Zawodowa.

Club career
She started playing against local boys in her home town of Brześć Kujawski at the age of 9. After joining Duet Włocławek, she was spotted by scouts when the team took part in a women's tournament in Konin and was invited to train at Medyk Konin, who she joined at the age of 14 under the coaching of Anna Gawrońska.

References

External links
 Player Polish domestic and international stats at PZPN 

1991 births
Living people
People from Włocławek County
Polish women's footballers
Poland women's international footballers
Medyk Konin players
Sportspeople from Kuyavian-Pomeranian Voivodeship
Women's association football midfielders